Clifford Bias (1910–1987) was a prominent psychic in early 20th-century America. Born in Huntington, West Virginia, he claimed that  he had been able to communicate with people who had long since died from the age of five.  He was ordained into the ministry in 1937 and served as a minister of churches in Jackson, Michigan; Buffalo, New York; Toledo, Ohio; St. Petersburg, Florida; and New York City. He helped organize the Spiritualist-Episcopal Church and the Universal Spiritualist Association and served as educational director and president of the Indiana Association of Spiritualists of Camp Chesterfield, Indiana. He was Dean of the Universal Spiritualist Institute, which held sessions each summer on various Mid-Western college campuses.

Bias organized a magical study group known as the Ancient Mystical Order of Seekers (A.M.O.S.) and he wrote and published a series of A.M.O.S. books, including The Probationer, L.V.X. The Book of Light, Sepher Yetzirah and the 32 Paths of Wisdom, The Neophyte, The Tarot – The Book of Thoth, The Way Back, The Western Mystery Tradition, and Qabalah, Tarot and the Western Mystery Tradition. His Ritual Book of Magic was published by Samuel Weiser in 1981. He is also featured in The Hierophant of 100th Street''' by Cullen Dorn. In the late 1970s, he led a series of quasi-religious services for psychics and mediums in the chapel located off of the lobby in The Ansonia Hotel in New York City. He retired in 1985 and settled in Anderson, Indiana, where he died in February 1987.  His publications include:Ritual Book of MagicQabalah, Tarot & the Western Mystery Tradition: The 22 Connecting PathsThe Way Back: A New Age Approach to the Western Mystery TraditionTrumpet Mediumship and Its DevelopmentA Manual of White Magic: Rituals, Spells, and IncantationsThe A.M.O.S. Path of LightThe Art of Astrological SynthesisSay Yes by Clifford Bias (corarichmondbooks.com)New Age Mediumship by Clifford Bias'' (corarichmondbooks.com)

References

American occult writers
American psychics
Clairvoyants
1987 deaths
1910 births